This is the list of the birds of New Zealand. The common name of the bird in New Zealand English is given first, and its Māori-language name, if different, is also noted.

New Zealand proper is an independent and sovereign state. New Zealand proper includes the North Island, the South Island, offshore islands, and outlying islands like the Chatham Islands. The Realm of New Zealand also includes Tokelau (a dependent territory); the Cook Islands and Niue (self-governing states in free association with New Zealand); and the Ross Dependency (New Zealand's territorial claim in Antarctica). Only New Zealand proper is represented on this list, not the full Realm of New Zealand.

Unless otherwise noted, all species listed below occur regularly in New Zealand as permanent residents, summer or winter visitors, or migrants. The species marked extinct became extinct subsequent to human arrival in New Zealand. About two thirds of the extinctions occurred after the arrival of Māori but before the arrival of Pākehā (European New Zealanders) and the rest since Pākehā arrived.

The following codes are used to denote other categories of species:

 (B) Breeding – confirmed nesting records in New Zealand or a portion thereof, excluding introduced species.
 (I) Introduced – a species introduced to New Zealand by the actions of humans, either directly or indirectly
 (X) Extinct – a species that became extinct after human arrival in New Zealand
 (ex) Extirpated – a species no longer found in New Zealand or a portion thereof but existing elsewhere
 (P) – a regularly occurring in New Zealand or a portion thereof.  The species occurs on an annual or mostly annual basis but does not nest in New Zealand.
 (V) Vagrant – a species rarely occurring in New Zealand or a portion thereof.

The list's taxonomic treatment and nomenclature (common and scientific names) mainly follows the conventions of The Clements Checklist of Birds of the World, 2022 edition. Some supplemental referencing is that of the Avibase Bird Checklists of the World as of 2022, and the 4th edition of the Checklist of the Birds of New Zealand, published in 2010 by Te Papa Press in association with the Ornithological Society of New Zealand, which is an authoritative list of the birds of New Zealand.

Kiwi
Order: Apterygiformes
Family: Apterygidae

Kiwi are flightless birds all native to New Zealand. Approximately the size of a domestic chicken, kiwi are by far the smallest living ratites.

Giant moa
Order: Dinornithiformes
Family: Dinornithidae

The giant moa (Dinornis) is an extinct genus of birds belonging to the moa family. As with other moa, it was a member of the order Dinornithiformes. It was endemic to New Zealand. Two species of Dinornis are considered valid, the North Island giant moa (Dinornis novaezealandiae) and the South Island giant moa (Dinornis robustus). In addition, two further species (new lineage A and lineage B) have been suggested based on distinct DNA lineages.

Lesser moa 
Order: Dinornithiformes
Family: Emeidae

The lesser moa (family Emeidae) were a family of moa. The moa were ratites from New Zealand. About two-thirds of all moa species are in the lesser moa family.

Upland moa 
Order: Dinornithiformes
Family: Megalapterygidae

The upland moa (Megalapteryx didinus) was a species of moa endemic to New Zealand. It was a ratite, a grouping of flightless birds with no keel on the sternum. It was the last moa species to become extinct, vanishing in 1445 CE, and was predominantly found in alpine and sub-alpine environments.

Ducks, geese, and swans
Order: AnseriformesFamily: Anatidae

The family Anatidae includes the ducks and most duck-like waterfowl, such as geese and swans. These are adapted for an aquatic existence, with webbed feet, bills that are flattened to a greater or lesser extent, and feathers that are excellent at shedding water due to special oils. The Cape Barren goose is also recorded as an escape from captivity in New Zealand which has bred, as well as being a vagrant from Australia as set out in the table below.

Guineafowl
Order: Galliformes
Family: Numididae

The guineafowl are a family of birds native to Africa. They typically eat insects and seeds, are ground-nesting, and resemble partridges, except with featherless heads.

New World quail
Order: GalliformesFamily: Odontophoridae

The New World quails are small, plump terrestrial birds only distantly related to the quails of the Old World, but named for their similar appearance and habits.

Megapodes 
Order: GalliformesFamily: Megapodiidae

The megapodes are stocky, medium-large, chicken-like birds with small heads and large feet. Their name literally means "large foot" and is a reference to the heavy legs and feet typical of these terrestrial birds. All are browsers, and all but the malleefowl occupy wooded habitats. 
{| class="wikitable" style="text-align:center"
|-
! width="200" |Species !! Kermadecs !! North I !! South I !! Stewart !! Chathams !! Snares !! Auckland !! Campbell !! Antipodes !! Bounty
|-
! Kermadec megapodeMegapodius sp. nov. 'Raoul Island 
|  XRecently Extinct Species|| || || || || || || || ||
|}
Pheasants and alliesOrder: GalliformesFamily: Phasianidae

Phasianidae consists of the pheasants and their allies. These are terrestrial species, variable in size but generally plump, with broad, relatively short wings. Many species are gamebirds or have been domesticated as a food source for humans.

GrebesOrder: PodicipediformesFamily: Podicipedidae

Grebes are small to medium-large freshwater diving birds. They have lobed toes and are excellent swimmers and divers. However, they have their feet placed far back on the body, making them quite ungainly on land.

Pigeons and dovesOrder: ColumbiformesFamily: Columbidae

Pigeons and doves are stout-bodied birds with short necks and short slender bills with a fleshy cere.

CuckoosOrder: CuculiformesFamily: Cuculidae

The family Cuculidae includes cuckoos, roadrunners and anis. These birds are of variable size with slender bodies, long tails and strong legs. The Old World cuckoos are brood parasites.

Owlet-nightjarsOrder: CaprimulgiformesFamily: Aegothelidae

The owlet-nightjars are a distinctive group of small nocturnal birds related to swifts found from the Maluku Islands and New Guinea to Australia and New Caledonia.

SwiftsOrder: CaprimulgiformesFamily: Apodidae

Swifts are small birds which spend the majority of their lives flying. These birds have very short legs and never settle voluntarily on the ground, perching instead only on vertical surfaces. Many swifts have long swept-back wings which resemble a crescent or boomerang.

AdzebillsOrder: GruiformesFamily: Aptornithidae

The adzebills, genus Aptornis, were two closely related bird species of the extinct family Aptornithidae.

RailsOrder: GruiformesFamily: Rallidae

Rallidae is a large family of small to medium-sized birds which includes the rails, crakes, coots and gallinules. The most typical family members occupy dense vegetation in damp environments near lakes, swamps or rivers. In general they are shy and secretive birds, making them difficult to observe. Most species have strong legs and long toes which are well adapted to soft uneven surfaces. They tend to have short, rounded wings and to be weak fliers.

CranesOrder: GruiformesFamily: Gruidae

Cranes are large, long-legged and long-necked birds. Unlike the similar-looking but unrelated herons, cranes fly with necks outstretched, not pulled back. Most have elaborate and noisy courting displays or "dances".

Stilts and avocetsOrder: CharadriiformesFamily: Recurvirostridae

Recurvirostridae is a family of large wading birds, which includes the avocets and stilts. The avocets have long legs and long up-curved bills. The stilts have extremely long legs and long, thin, straight bills.

OystercatchersOrder: CharadriiformesFamily: Haematopodidae

The oystercatchers are large, obvious and noisy plover-like birds, with strong bills used for smashing or prying open molluscs.

Plovers and lapwingsOrder: CharadriiformesFamily: Charadriidae

The family Charadriidae includes the plovers, dotterels and lapwings. They are small to medium-sized birds with compact bodies, short, thick necks and long, usually pointed, wings. They are found in open country worldwide, mostly in habitats near water.

Painted-snipesOrder: CharadriiformesFamily: Rostratulidae

Painted-snipes are short-legged, long-billed birds similar in shape to the true snipes, but more brightly coloured.

Sandpipers and alliesOrder: CharadriiformesFamily: Scolopacidae

The Scolopacidae is a large diverse family of small to medium-sized shorebirds including the sandpipers, curlews, godwits, shanks, tattlers, woodcocks, snipes, dowitchers and phalaropes. The majority of these species eat small invertebrates picked out of the mud or soil. Different lengths of legs and bills enable multiple species to feed in the same habitat, particularly on the coast, without direct competition for food.

Pratincoles and coursersOrder: CharadriiformesFamily: Glareolidae

Pratincoles have short legs, very long pointed wings and long forked tails. Their most unusual feature for birds classed as waders is that they typically hunt their insect prey on the wing like swallows, although they can also feed on the ground. Their short bills are an adaptation to aerial feeding.

SkuasOrder: CharadriiformesFamily: Stercorariidae

They are in general medium to large birds, typically with grey or brown plumage, often with white markings on the wings. They have longish bills with hooked tips and webbed feet with sharp claws. They look like large dark gulls, but have a fleshy cere above the upper mandible. They are strong, acrobatic fliers.

Gulls, terns, and skimmersOrder: CharadriiformesFamily: Laridae

Laridae is a family of medium to large seabirds and includes gulls, terns, kittiwakes and skimmers. They are typically grey or white, often with black markings on the head or wings. They have stout, longish bills and webbed feet.

TropicbirdsOrder: PhaethontiformesFamily: Phaethontidae

Tropicbirds are slender white birds of tropical oceans, with exceptionally long central tail feathers. Their long wings have black markings, as does the head.

PenguinsOrder: SphenisciformesFamily: Spheniscidae

The penguins are a group of aquatic, flightless birds living almost exclusively in the Southern Hemisphere. Most penguins feed on krill, fish, squid, and other forms of sealife caught while swimming underwater.

AlbatrossesOrder: ProcellariiformesFamily: Diomedeidae

The albatrosses are a family of large seabird found across the Southern and North Pacific Oceans. The largest are among the largest flying birds in the world.

 Austral storm petrels Order: ProcellariiformesFamily: Oceanitidae

The southern storm-petrels are the smallest seabirds, relatives of the petrels, feeding on planktonic crustaceans and small fish picked from the surface, typically while hovering. Their flight is fluttering and sometimes bat-like.

Northern storm petrelsOrder: ProcellariiformesFamily: Hydrobatidae

Northern storm-petrels are small birds which spend most of their lives at sea, coming ashore only to breed. They feed on planktonic crustaceans and small fish picked from the surface, typically while hovering or pattering across the water. Their flight is fluttering and sometimes bat-like.

 Petrels and shearwaters Order: ProcellariiformesFamily: Procellariidae

The procellariids are the main group of medium-sized "true petrels", characterised by united nostrils with medium nasal septum, and a long outer functional primary flight feather.

FrigatebirdsOrder: SuliformesFamily: Fregatidae

Frigatebirds are large seabirds usually found over tropical oceans. They are large, black-and-white, or completely black, with long wings and deeply forked tails. The males have coloured inflatable throat pouches. They do not swim or walk and cannot take off from a flat surface. Having the largest wingspan-to-body-weight ratio of any bird, they are essentially aerial, able to stay aloft for more than a week.
 

Boobies and gannetsOrder: SuliformesFamily: Sulidae

The sulids comprise the gannets and boobies. Both groups are medium-large coastal seabirds that plunge-dive for fish.

DartersOrder: SuliformesFamily: Anhingidae

Anhingas or darters are frequently referred to as "snake-birds" because of their long thin neck, which gives a snake-like appearance when they swim with their bodies submerged.
The males have black and dark brown plumage, an erectile crest on the nape and a larger bill than the female. The females have a much paler plumage especially on the neck and underparts. The darters have completely webbed feet, and their legs are short and set far back on the body. Their plumage is somewhat permeable, like that of cormorants, and they spread their wings to dry after diving.

Cormorants and shagsOrder: SuliformesFamily: Phalacrocoracidae

The Phalacrocoracidae is a family of medium-to-large coastal, fish-eating sea-birds that includes cormorants and shags. Plumage colouration varies with the majority having mainly dark plumage, some species being black and white, and a few being colourful. The bill is long, thin and sharply hooked.

PelicansOrder: PelecaniformesFamily: Pelecanidae

Pelicans are large water birds with distinctive pouches under their bills. Like other birds in the order Pelecaniformes, they have four webbed toes.

Herons, egrets, and bitternsOrder: PelecaniformesFamily: Ardeidae

The family Ardeidae contains the bitterns, herons and egrets. Herons and egrets are medium to large sized wading birds with long necks and legs. Bitterns tend to be shorter necked and more wary. Unlike other long-necked birds suck as storks, ibises and spoonbills, members of Ardeidae fly with their necks retracted.

Ibises and spoonbillsOrder: PelecaniformesFamily: Threskiornithidae

The Threskiornithidae is a family of large terrestrial and wading birds which includes the ibises and spoonbills. They have long, broad wings with 11 primary and about 20 secondary feathers. They are strong fliers and despite their size and weight, very capable soarers.

Hawks, eagles, and kitesOrder: AccipitriformesFamily: Accipitridae

Accipitridae is a family of birds of prey and includes the osprey, hawks, eagles, kites, harriers and Old World vultures. These birds have very large powerful hooked beaks for tearing flesh from their prey, strong legs, powerful talons and keen eyesight.

 True owls Order: StrigiformesFamily: Strigidae

Typical owls are small to large solitary nocturnal birds of prey. They have large forward-facing eyes and ears, a hawk-like beak and a conspicuous circle of feathers around each eye called a facial disk.

Barn owlsOrder: StrigiformesFamily: Tytonidae

Barn owls are medium to large owls with large heads and characteristic heart-shaped faces. They have long strong legs with powerful talons.

KingfishersOrder: CoraciiformesFamily: Alcedinidae

Kingfishers are medium-sized birds with large heads, long, pointed bills, short legs, and stubby tails.

RollersOrder: CoraciiformesFamily: Coraciidae

Rollers resemble crows in size and build, but are more closely related to the kingfishers and bee-eaters. They share the colourful appearance of those groups with blues and browns predominating. The two inner front toes are connected, but the outer toe is not.

Falcons and caracarasOrder: FalconiformesFamily: Falconidae

Falconidae is a family of diurnal birds of prey, notably the falcons and caracaras. They differ from hawks, eagles and kites in that they kill with their beaks instead of their talons.

 Kea and kākā Order: PsittaciformesFamily: Nestoridae

The genus Nestor is the type and only extant genus of the parrot family Nestoridae. The genus Nestor contains two extant parrot species from New Zealand and two extinct species from Norfolk Island, Australia and Chatham Island, New Zealand, respectively.

 Kākāpō Order: PsittaciformesFamily: Strigopidae

The kākāpō, also known as owl parrot (Strigops habroptilus), is a species of large, flightless, nocturnal, ground-dwelling parrot of the super-family Strigopoidea, endemic to New Zealand.

CockatoosOrder: PsittaciformesFamily: Cacatuidae

The cockatoos share many features with other parrots including the characteristic curved beak shape and a zygodactyl foot, with two forward toes and two backwards toes. They differ, however in a number of characteristics, including the often spectacular movable headcrest.

Old world parrotsOrder: PsittaciformesFamily: Psittaculidae

Characteristic features of parrots include a strong curved bill, an upright stance, strong legs, and clawed zygodactyl feet. Many parrots are vividly coloured, and some are multi-coloured. Old World parrots are found from Africa east across south and southeast Asia and Oceania to Australia and New Zealand.

New Zealand wrensOrder: PasseriformesFamily: Acanthisittidae

The New Zealand wrens  are a family (Acanthisittidae) of tiny passerines endemic to New Zealand. They were represented by six known species in four or five genera, although only two species survive in two genera today. They are understood to form a distinct lineage within the passerines, but authorities differ on their assignment to the oscines or suboscines (the two suborders that between them make up the Passeriformes).

HoneyeatersOrder: PasseriformesFamily: Meliphagidae

The honeyeaters are a large and diverse family, Meliphagidae, of small to medium-sized birds. The family includes the Australian chats, myzomelas, friarbirds, wattlebirds, miners and melidectes. They are most common in Australia and New Guinea, but also found in New Zealand, the Pacific islands as far east as Samoa and Tonga, and the islands to the north and west of New Guinea known as Wallacea.

 Scrubwrens, thornbills, and gerygones Order: PasseriformesFamily: Acanthizidae

The Acanthizidae are small- to medium-sized birds with short rounded wings, slender bills, long legs, and a short tail. 

 Cuckooshrikes and trillers Order: PasseriformesFamily: Campephagidae

The cuckooshrikes are small to medium-sized passerine birds. They are predominantly greyish with white and black, although some minivet species are brightly coloured.

WhiteheadsOrder: PasseriformesFamily: MohouidaeMohoua is a small genus of three bird species endemic to New Zealand. The scientific name is taken from mohua – the Māori name for the Yellowhead. Their taxonomic placement has presented problems: They have typically been placed in the whistler family, Pachycephalidae, but in 2013 it was established that they are best placed in their own family, Mohouidae.

Old World oriolesOrder: PasseriformesFamily: Oriolidae

The Old World orioles are colourful passerine birds which are not closely related to the New World orioles

Woodswallows, bellmagpies, and alliesOrder: PasseriformesFamily: Artamidae

The woodswallows are soft-plumaged, somber-coloured passerine birds. They are smooth, agile flyers with moderately large, semi-triangular wings.

FantailsOrder: PasseriformesFamily: Rhipiduridae

The fantails are small insectivorous birds with longish, frequently fanned, tails.

Monarch flycatchersOrder: PasseriformesFamily: Monarchidae

The monarch flycatchers are small to medium-sized insectivorous passerines which hunt by gleaning, hovering or flycatching.

Crows, jays, and magpiesOrder: PasseriformesFamily: Corvidae

The family Corvidae includes crows, ravens, jays, choughs, magpies, treepies, nutcrackers, and ground jays. Corvids are above average in size among the Passeriformes, and some of the larger species show high levels of intelligence.

New Zealand wattlebirds Order: PasseriformesFamily: CallaeidaeCallaeidae (sometimes Callaeatidae) is a family of passerine birds endemic to New Zealand. It contains three genera, with five species in the family.  One species, the huia, became extinct early in the 20th century, while the South Island kokako is critically endangered and may be extinct.

StitchbirdOrder: PasseriformesFamily: Notiomystidae

The stitchbird or hihi (Notiomystis cincta) is a honeyeater-like bird endemic to the North Island and adjacent offshore islands of New Zealand. Its evolutionary relationships have long puzzled ornithologists, but it is now classed as the only member of its own family, the Notiomystidae.

Australasian robinsOrder: PasseriformesFamily: Petroicidae

The bird family Petroicidae includes 49 species in 19 genera. All are endemic to Australasia: New Guinea, Australia, New Zealand and numerous Pacific Islands as far east as Samoa. For want of an accurate common name, the family is often called the Australasian robins. Within the family the species are known not only as robins but as scrub-robins and flyrobins. They are, however, only distantly related to the Old World family Muscicapidae (to which other species with such names belong) and the monarch flycatchers (Monarchidae).

LarksOrder: PasseriformesFamily: Alaudidae

Larks are small terrestrial birds with often extravagant songs and display flights. Most larks are fairly dull in appearance. Their food is insects and seeds.

Reed warblers and alliesOrder: PasseriformesFamily: Acrocephalidae

The members of this family are usually rather large for "warblers". Most are rather plain olivaceous brown above with much yellow to beige below. They are usually found in open woodland, reedbeds, or tall grass. The family occurs mostly in southern to western Eurasia and surroundings, but it also ranges far into the Pacific, with some species in Africa.

Grassbirds and alliesOrder: PasseriformesFamily: Locustellidae

Locustellidae are a family of small insectivorous songbirds found mainly in Eurasia, Africa, and the Australian region. They are smallish birds with tails that are usually long and pointed, and tend to be drab brownish or buffy all over.

SwallowsOrder: PasseriformesFamily: Hirundinidae

The family Hirundinidae is adapted to aerial feeding. They have a slender streamlined body, long pointed wings, and a short bill with a wide gape. The feet are adapted to perching rather than walking, and the front toes are partially joined at the base.

BulbulsOrder: PasseriformesFamily: Pycnonotidae

Bulbuls are medium-sized songbirds. Some are colourful with yellow, red, or orange vents, cheeks, throats, or supercilia, but most are drab, with uniform olive-brown to black plumage. Some species have distinct crests.

White-eyesOrder: PasseriformesFamily: Zosteropidae

The white-eyes are small birds of rather drab appearance, the plumage above being typically greenish-olive, but some species have a white or bright yellow throat, breast, or lower parts, and several have buff flanks. As the name suggests, many species have a white ring around each eye.

StarlingsOrder: PasseriformesFamily: Sturnidae

Starlings are small to medium-sized passerine birds. Their flight is strong and direct and they are very gregarious. Their preferred habitat is fairly open country. They eat insects and fruit. Plumage is typically dark with a metallic sheen.

ThrushesOrder: PasseriformesFamily: Turdidae

The thrushes are a group of passerine birds that occur mainly in the Old World. They are plump, soft plumaged, small to medium-sized insectivores or sometimes omnivores, often feeding on the ground. Many have attractive songs.

AccentorsOrder: PasseriformesFamily: Prunellidae

The accentors are a genus of birds in the family Prunellidae, which is the only bird family endemic to the Palearctic. This small group of closely related passerines are all in the genus Prunella.

Old World sparrowsOrder: PasseriformesFamily: Passeridae

Sparrows are small passerine birds, typically small, plump, brown or grey with short tails and short powerful beaks. They are seed-eaters, but also consume small insects.

Wagtails and pipitsOrder: PasseriformesFamily: Motacillidae

Motacillidae is a family of small passerine birds with medium to long tails and comprises the wagtails, longclaws, and pipits. These are slender ground-feeding insectivores of open country.

True finchesOrder: PasseriformesFamily: Fringillidae

Finches are small to moderately large seed-eating passerine birds with a strong beak, usually conical and in some species very large. All have 12 tail feathers and nine primary flight feathers. Finches have a bouncing flight, alternating bouts of flapping with gliding on closed wings, and most sing well.

Old World buntingsOrder: PasseriformesFamily''': Emberizidae

The emberizids are a large family of seed-eating birds with distinctively shaped bills. Many emberizid species have distinctive head patterns.

See also
 List of birds of Australia, New Zealand and Antarctica
 Lists of birds by region
 List of endemic birds of New Zealand
 Fauna of New Zealand

Notes

References

Heather, Barrie; Robertson, Hugh (1996). The Field Guide to the Birds of New Zealand. 
Collinson, Martin (June 2006). "Splitting headaches? Recent taxonomic changes affecting the British and Western Palaearctic lists" British Birds'' vol 99, pp. 306–323.

External links
 New Zealand Birds online A comprehensive guide to the birds of New Zealand, maintained by Birds New Zealand, the Department of Conservation, and Te Papa. 
 CSV file with names from New Zealand Birds online A list of all New Zealand Birds including common and scientific names, derived from New Zealand Birds online.
 New Zealand birds A–Z, Department of Conservation
What Bird? A tool for identifying birds that are likely to be encountered in and around New Zealand forests (not intended to be a complete database of the birds of New Zealand).
 TerraNature New Zealand native birds list.

'
New Zealand
Birds